The 1966 San Francisco Dons men's soccer team represented the University of San Francisco during the 1966 NCAA Division I Men's Soccer Season. The Dons won their first NCAA Soccer Championship title this season, defeating Long Island in the championship. It was the 23rd season the Dons fielded a men's varsity soccer team.

Background 
The 1966 team was coached by Stephen Negoesco for his fifth season at the helm. Negoesco guided the Dons to an 11-0-1 record. On the third of December, the USF soccer team played through mud to beat the Long Island University team with a 5-2 victory and the NCAA championship.

Roster

Schedule 

|-
!colspan=6 style=""| Preseason
|-

|-
!colspan=6 style=""| Regular season
|-

|-
!colspan=6 style=""| NCAA Tournament
|-

|-

References

External links 
Record Book

1966
1966 NCAA soccer independents season
1966 in sports in California
NCAA Division I Men's Soccer Tournament-winning seasons
NCAA Division I Men's Soccer Tournament College Cup seasons
1966 in San Francisco